Years Gone By is a studio album by Albert King, released 1969.

Track listing
"Wrapped Up in Love Again" (Albert King) – 2:18
"You Don't Love Me" (instrumental) (Willie Cobbs) – 3:28
"Cockroach" (Bettye Crutcher, Deanie Parker) – 3:18
"Killing Floor" (Chester Burnett) – 3:05
"Lonely Man" (Milton Campbell, Bob Lyons) – 2:39
"If the Washing Don't Get You, The Rinsing Will" (Homer Banks, James Cross, Allen Jones) – 2:12
"Drownin' on Dry Land" (Mickey Gregory, Allen Jones) – 3:54
"Drownin' on Dry Land" (instrumental) (Mickey Gregory, Allen Jones) – 2:38
"Heart Fixing Business" (Homer Banks, Allen Jones) – 2:41
"You Threw Your Love on Me Too Strong" (Albert King) – 3:14
"Sky Is Crying" (Elmore James, Morgan Robinson) – 4:09

Personnel
 Albert King – lead guitar, vocals
 Booker T. Jones – keyboards, piano, organ
 Steve Cropper – rhythm guitar
 Donald Dunn – bass guitar
 Al Jackson Jr. – drums, arrangements
Technical
Ron Capone - recording engineer
Honeya Thompson - art direction
Don Paulsen - cover photography

References

1969 albums
Albert King albums
Stax Records albums
Albums produced by Al Jackson Jr.